Zinta may refer to:

 Preity Zinta, an Indian actress
 Zinta (given name), a given name